"Good Morning to the Night" is a song by English musician Elton John and Australian electronic dance duo Pnau. It was released in Australia on 6 July 2012 as the lead single from the album of the same name. In November 2012, John and Pnau performed the song live on The X Factor Australia. The song peaked at number 71 on the ARIA charts.

The song incorporates elements from the following original Elton John sound recordings: "Philadelphia Freedom", "Mona Lisas and Mad Hatters", "Funeral for a Friend/Love Lies Bleeding", "Tonight", "Gulliver/It's Hay Chewed", "Sixty Years On", "Goodbye Yellow Brick Road", and "Someone Saved My Life Tonight".

Reception
In an album review, Phil Mongredien from The Guardian said, "The dazzling title track combines eight of Elton's lesser-known pieces to create an uplifting club anthem – in the vein of Modjo's 'Lady' – that seems a sure-fire summer hit."

Track listings
1 track
"Good Morning to the Night" – 3:30

CD single
"Good Morning to the Night" (Cahill remix) – 3:30
"Good Morning to the Night" (Album version) – 3:21

Charts

Release history

References

Songs about nights
2012 songs
2012 singles
Elton John songs
Pnau songs
Songs with music by Elton John